Berazategui is a partido in Buenos Aires Province, Argentina.

It was part of the Quilmes Partido until 1960.

The majority of the population are concentrated in the city of Berazategui, which has an important commercial district with a pedestrian centre.

Berazategui is also home to Asociación Deportiva Berazategui, a football club that play in the regionalised 4th division of Argentine football.

Settlements
Berazategui (capital)
El Pato
Juan María Gutiérrez
Ranelagh
Sourigues
Pereyra
Plátanos
Villa España
Hudson

References

External links

 
 Internet Guide to Berazategui
 Info Berazategui
 Berazategui Historical Association

 
1960 establishments in Argentina
Partidos of Buenos Aires Province